Local elections were held in the United Kingdom on 3 May 1979 (the same day as the general election). The results provided some source of comfort to the Labour Party, who recovered some lost ground from local election reversals in previous years, despite losing the general election to the Conservative Party on the same day. The Liberals also gained councillors and a council.

Labour gained 766 seats, bringing their number of councillors to 7,410.

The Conservatives lost 423 seats, leaving them with 12,222 councillors.

The Liberal Party gained 136 seats and finished with 1,059 councillors.

Changes in council control were as follows;

Labour gain from no overall control: Bassetlaw, Carlisle, Hartlepool, Newcastle-under-Lyme, South Tyneside

Labour gain from Conservative: Barrow-in-Furness, Coventry, Derby, Ipswich, Nottingham, Sandwell, Tameside, Welwyn Hatfield

Labour lose to no overall control: Thurrock

Conservative lose to no overall control: Birmingham, Cambridge, Cheltenham, Kirklees, Leeds, Pendle, Rochdale, Rugby, Warrington, Wyre Forest

Conservative gain from no overall control: Adur, Stratford-on-Avon

Conservative gain from Independent: Hart

Conservative gain from Democratic Labour: Lincoln

Liberal gain from no overall control: Medina

Independent lose to no overall control: South Lakeland, West Lindsey

England

Metropolitan boroughs

Whole council
In 6 metropolitan boroughs the whole council was up for election.

In 6 boroughs there were new ward boundaries, following electoral boundary reviews by the Local Government Boundary Commission for England.

‡ New ward boundaries

Third of council
30 metropolitan borough councils had one third of their seats up for election.

District councils

Whole council
In 252 districts the whole council was up for election.

In 153 districts there were new ward boundaries, following electoral boundary reviews by the Local Government Boundary Commission for England.

‡ New ward boundaries

Third of council
In 44 districts one third of the council was up for election.

Wales

District councils

References

Local elections 2006. House of Commons Library Research Paper 06/26.
Vote 1999 BBC News
Vote 2000 BBC News

 
Local elections